The Rite of Spring is a 1913 ballet and orchestral concert work by Igor Stravinsky.

Rite(s) of Spring may also refer to:

Music
 The Rite of Spring (MacMillan), a 1962 ballet by Kenneth MacMillan
 The Rite of Spring (Hubert Laws album), 1971
 The Rite of Spring (The Bad Plus album), 2014
 "Rite of Spring", a song by Angels & Airwaves from I-Empire, 2007
 Rites of Spring, an American post-hardcore band

Film
 Rite of Spring (film), a 1963 Portuguese film by Manoel de Oliveira
 Rites of Spring (film), a 2011 American horror film
 The Rite of Spring (film), a 2022 Spanish film

Other uses
 "A Rite of Spring", a science fiction short story by Fritz Leiber
 La consagración de la primavera (The Rite of Spring) (1978), a novel by Alejo Carpentier

See also 
 The Rite of Spring discography
 The Rite of Strings, an album by Al Di Meola, Stanley Clarke, and Jean-Luc Ponty